KWL may refer to:
 KWL Table, a graphical organizer.
 Guilin Liangjiang International Airport, an airport with KWL as its IATA code.
 Kidwelly railway station, Kidwelly, Carmarthenshire, National Rail station code